William Osbourne may refer to:

William Osbourne (MP) for Rochester (UK Parliament constituency)
William Osbourne (screenwriter) of Kevin of the North

See also
William Osborne (disambiguation)